Randal James Woollatt (19 July 1909 – 9 April 1984) was an English cricketer. Woollatt was a right-handed batsman. He was born at Claygate, Surrey, and was educated at Cheltenham College.

Woollatt made his debut for the Surrey Second XI in the 1929 Minor Counties Championship against Devon. From 1929 to 1932, Woollatt made 22 appearances for the team in the Minor Counties Championship, the last of which came against the Kent Second XI. In 1930, he made his only appearance in first-class cricket for a combined Minor Counties team against Lancashire at Old Trafford. Batting first, the Minor Counties made 216 all out, with Woollatt making 13 runs before he was dismissed by Len Hopwood. Lancashire were then dismissed for 188 in their first-innings, to which the Minor Counties responded in to in their second-innings by reaching 9 without loss, before the match was declared a draw, with no play possible on the final day. Woollatt never appeared for the Surrey first eleven in first-class cricket.

He died at Cheltenham, Gloucestershire, on 9 April 1984.

References

External links
Randal Woollatt at ESPNcricinfo
Randal Woollatt at CricketArchive

1909 births
1984 deaths
People from Claygate
People educated at Cheltenham College
English cricketers
Minor Counties cricketers
Sportspeople from Gloucestershire